Dodurga may refer to:

Places 
Dodurga, Çerkeş
Dodurga, Çorum, a district center in Çorum Province
Dodurga, Bilecik, a town in Bozüyük district of Bilecik Province
Dodurga, Orta
Dodurga, Sandıklı, a village in Sandıklı district of Afyonkarahisar Province

People 
Dodurga (tribe), an Oghuz Turkic tribe

See also
Dodurga Dam